The Victorian Funds Management Corporation (VFMC) is an agency of the Government of Victoria in Melbourne.

The VFMC was established by the Victorian Funds Management Act 1994. Its role is to provide investment and funds management services to Victorian public authorities.

References

Government agencies of Victoria (Australia)
Investment companies of Australia